Ermanno Pignatti (8 August 1921 – 30 October 1995) was an Italian weightlifter. He competed at the 1952 and 1956 Summer Olympics and finished in ninth and third place, respectively. He won five medals at the European Championships in 1950–1958.

References

External links
 
 

1921 births
1995 deaths
Italian male weightlifters
Olympic weightlifters of Italy
Weightlifters at the 1952 Summer Olympics
Weightlifters at the 1956 Summer Olympics
Olympic bronze medalists for Italy
Olympic medalists in weightlifting
Medalists at the 1956 Summer Olympics
European Weightlifting Championships medalists
20th-century Italian people